Frank Heller was the pen name of the Swedish writer Gunnar Serner (20 July 1886 - 14 October 1947), (aged 61). He wrote a string of light books about shady business transactions in an international milieu. His best known works concerned the recurring character Philip Collin, who was simultaneously a detective and a thief. He was uncle to the actor Håkan Serner.

Bibliography
 The Emperor's Old Clothes, 1923 New York (also published as The Chinese Coats, London 1924) translated by Robert Emmons Lee (1888-1925)
 The Marriage of Yussuf Khan, Crowell New York 1923, Hutchinson & Co London 1924, translated by Robert Emmons Lee (1888-1925)
 The Grand Duke's Finances, translated by Robert Emmons Lee (1888-1925)
 on which Murnau's film The Grand Duke's Finances (German: Die Finanzen des Großherzogs)
 The Perilous Transactions of Mr. Collin, 1924, likely the same as:
 The London Adventures of Mr. Collin, 1923, translated by Pauline Chary
Collection of the following short stories:
 The story of the absent-minded gentleman
 The sorrowful adventures of Mr. Isaacs
 The mystery of the lost bullion
 Mr. Collin becomes a landlord
 Mr. Collin's holliday agency
 The blue-eyed lie
 Mr. Collin is Ruined, 1925
 The Strange Adventures of Mr. Collin, Crowell New York 1926
 The Thousand and Second Night, An Arabesque. Williams & Norgate, London, 1926, translated by Robert Emmons Lee (1888-1925) 
 Lead Me into Temptation, Crowell New York 1927, translated by Robert Emmons Lee (1888-1925)
 Twilight of the Gladiators, 1944

References

External links 
 

Swedish-language writers
1947 deaths
1886 births
Swedish male novelists
20th-century Swedish novelists
20th-century Swedish male writers